Morsacanthus is a monotypic genus of flowering plants belonging to the family Acanthaceae. The only species is Morsacanthus nemoralis .

It is native to southern Brazil.

The genus name of Morsacanthus is in honour of Walter Baptist Mors (1920–2008), a Brazilian chemist who researched useful plants. The Latin specific epithet of nemoralis means coming from the forest.
Both genus and species were first described and published in Revista Brasil. Biol. Vol.12 on page 261 in 1952.

References

Acanthaceae
Acanthaceae genera
Monotypic Lamiales genera
Plants described in 1952
Flora of Brazil